Sara Louise Gomer (born 13 May 1964) is a retired tennis player from Great Britain. A left-hander, she competed for Britain at the 1988 Summer Olympics in Seoul and the 1992 Summer Olympics in Barcelona. She won two singles titles on the ITF Circuit, and reached her highest individual ranking on the WTA Tour on 26 September 1988, when she became number 46 in the world and number 1 in Great Britain. Gomer won one WTA singles title, the 1988 Northern California Open, in Aptos, California, coached by Chris Bradnam. She became the last British WTA title-winner until Heather Watson won the 2012 HP Open.

She played in four editions of the Wightman Cup, playing five singles and four doubles matches, which were all losses, from 1986 to 1989. When she lost in the first round of the 1985 U.S. Open, her opponent Mary Joe Fernández, aged 14 years and 8 days, became the youngest player to win a main draw match at any U.S. Open.

She played in the French Open in 1983, 1985–87, 1989, 1991, and 1992; in the Australian Open in 1983-85, 1987–88, and 1990-1992; and in the US Open in 1983, 1985–89, and 1991-92. She played at the Wimbledon Championships every year from 1981-1992.

She reached the quarterfinal of the 1987 Federation Cup and the final of the 1988 Federation Cup.

Gomer retired from competitive tennis in 1992. Soon afterwards she married John Palombo, an IT expert. They have three children. She now only plays tennis occasionally.

WTA Tour finals

Singles (1 title)

References

External links
 
 
 

1964 births
Living people
English female tennis players
Olympic tennis players of Great Britain
Sportspeople from Torquay
Tennis players at the 1988 Summer Olympics
Tennis players at the 1992 Summer Olympics
Tennis people from Devon
British female tennis players